ThinkFilm (stylized as TH!NKFilm) was a U.S. film distribution company founded in September 2001. It had been a division of David Bergstein’s Capitol Films since 2006.

On October 5, 2010, five of Bergstein's companies in the film industry, Capitol Films, ThinkFilm, R2D2, CT-1 and Capco were forced into Chapter 11 bankruptcy by a group of creditors led by the Aramid Entertainment film investment fund seeking payment for outstanding debts of $16 million.

This led to a Hollywood legal battle involving Bergstein, his financial partner, Ronald Tudor, the creditors and various lawyers and companies in the industry.

Films distributed

References

Film distributors of the United States
Defunct mass media companies of the United States
Mass media companies established in 2001
Mass media companies disestablished in 2010
Companies that filed for Chapter 11 bankruptcy in 2010